The "" (English: Weekly magazine for the German book trade), until 2002 "" (English: Trade exchange newspaper for the German book trade), is the association organ of the Börsenverein des Deutschen Buchhandels. The publication, founded in 1834, is the magazine with the highest number of advertisements and circulation in the German book selling trade. It came out once a week, later twice a week, and even daily for many years.
It informs the professional audience as well as private readers about news on the book market. Since January 2013, the specialist magazine has been published in weekly alternation as the "" and the "". The  highlights the trends within the various product groups. Current industry reports are published on the magazine's homepage.

The  publishes various bestseller lists, including an audio book best list, a non-fiction best list, a bestseller lists with the best-selling titles from fiction and non-fiction as well as, since spring 2018, the independent charts of publications from smaller, independent publishers.

Editor-in-chief is Torsten Casimir, the previously head of Feuilleton of the Rheinische Post.

History 
Since the beginning of 1835, B. G. Teubner at Augustusplatz in Leipzig took over the printing. At first, the  appeared weekly, but then changed to daily from 1867.

In the Western occupation zones the paper appeared under the same title (or ) with the addition "" (English: Frankfurt Edition) from 1945. Sine 1946,  was again published weekly in the Soviet zone of occupation.

In 1990, the two  publications were issued separately for the last time (Leipzig: 157th year). Since the merger of the two e on 1 January 1991 only one  has been published each week. The Leipzig mode of counting volumes was adopted.

In April 2020, the Saxon State and University Library Dresden (SLUB) made the years 1834 to 1945 available as full text free of charge.

Awards 

See also 
 BuchMarkt

References

Further reading

External links 
 Official website
 Börsenblatt digital: Digital edition of the years 1834 to 1945

Publications established in 1834
German-language magazines
Magazines about the media
Bookselling